Sněžník may refer to:
Děčínský Sněžník, a mountain in the Czech Republic, near Děčín
Králický Sněžník (Polish Śnieżnik), a mountain on the Czech–Polish border
Králický Sněžník (range)